Nicolas Julliard better known by his stage name Fauve (born in Geneva, Switzerland on 21 March 1972) is a Swiss musician and singer.

He studied art history in addition to learning classic guitar and in 1999, launched his own record label Snowcat Records, with his first release being  the single "Graceland" under the pseudonym Sombre. He was also part of Illford, a post-rock band based in Lausanne, where he was a guitarist.

Taking the stage name Fauve, in May 2006, he released his debut self-titled solo album Fauve on the Lausanne-based Gentlemen Records. After joining French singer Dominique A in carte blanche during Fnac Indétendances festival at Paris-Plages, in July 2007, her appeared in Montreux Jazz Festival, under the billing Fauve & Raphelson featuring Erik Truffaz, Sophie Hunger, John Parish and the Lausanne Sinfonietta. A double CD and DVD of the concert titled An Evening At The Montreux Jazz Festival 2007 was released by Gentlemen Records in November 2007.

In 2008, Fauve wrote and performed a soundtrack for the Alfred Hitchcock silent film The Lodger: A Story of the London Fog and in 2010, accompanied the Swiss singer Olivia Pedroli in her tour and remixed for électro artist POL and in 2011, collaborated with the electro artist Xewin in two tracks of Xewin's second album followed by his ow studio album Clocks'n'Clouds again on Two Gentlemen label.

In popular culture
In 2004, the French music magazine Les Inrockuptibles included one of the tracks of Julliard under his pseudonym Sombre for its second annual compilation album CQFD 2004 (standing for Ceux qu'il faut découvrir meaning those that need to be discovered).
In 2012, Fauve created the soundtrack for the Fribourg International Film festival (FIFF).

Discography
Studio albums
2006: Fauve
2011: Clocks'n'Clouds
Live albums
2007: An Evening at the Montreux Jazz Festival 2007 (with Raphelson)
EP and maxis
2001: Graceland EP
2004: Acoustica ＃1
Remixes
2010: Stupid Folked-Up remix (for POL)
2011: You Caught Me remix (for Olivia Pedroli)
Appearances
2004: "Cyberite" (credited as Sombre) in CQFD 2004 (Ceux qu'il faut découvrir) - compilation du magazine Les Inrockuptibles
2006: FNAC Indétendances
2006: "Beyond Thirty" on Amazon Grace 
2007: "Retreat" on The Pet Series Volume 6
2011: "Johnny Guitar" on Le Lustre
2012: "Skull" in tribute album A Tribute to Sebadoh's Bakesale
2013: "Between My Legs" in The LP Collection Vol. 1

References

1972 births
Living people
Musicians from Geneva
21st-century Swiss  male singers